Live 1990 may refer to:
 Live 1990 (Hatfield and the North album)
 Live 1990 (Hawkwind album)